Beck, later called Beck – Lockpojken, is a 1997 film about the Swedish police detective Martin Beck directed by Pelle Seth.

Cast 
 Peter Haber as Martin Beck
 Mikael Persbrandt as Gunvald Larsson
 Figge Norling as Benny Skacke
 Stina Rautelin as Lena Klingström
 Per Morberg as Joakim Wersén
 Niklas Falk as judge Lagerfeldt
 Ingvar Hirdwall as Martin Beck's neighbour
 Rebecka Hemse as Inger (Martin Beck's daughter)
 Fredrik Ultvedt as Jens Loftsgård
 Mikael Nyqvist as John Banck
 Anna Ulrica Ericsson as Yvonne Jäder
 Peter Hüttner as Oljelund
 Bo Höglund as Mats (the waiter)
 Stefan Roos as Keith Karlsson
 Oskar Löfkvist as Aron
 Lamin Touray as Nicklas
 Roderyk Mundenius as Paaren
 Mina Azarian as Ino (Paaren's mother)

References

External links 

Martin Beck films
1997 television films
1997 films
1997 crime films
1990s police procedural films
Swedish television films
Films directed by Pelle Seth
1990s Swedish films